The Hong Kong Film Critics Society Awards are the annual awards given by the Hong Kong Film Critics Society in Hong Kong since 1994. The awards are determined by votes cast in three rounds after a substantial discussion session between the members of the society. The transcript of such discussion can be found in the annual journal of Hong Kong film reviews which is published by the society every year.

The society presented the awards in a casual but star-studded ceremony. Over the years, several venues have been used for the award presentation, including Planet Hollywood Restaurant (closed), Hong Kong Art Centre, Hong Kong Convention and Exhibition Centre, and Hong Kong Film Archive.

Awards ceremonies

Notes

External links
 Official site
 Hong Kong Film Critics Society Awards at Internet Movie Database

Hong Kong Film Critics Society Awards
Cinema of Hong Kong
Chinese film awards
Awards established in 1995
Annual events in Hong Kong
1995 establishments in Hong Kong